Mission  (from Latin  'the act of sending out') may refer to:

Organised activities

Religion 
Christian mission, an organized effort to spread Christianity
Mission (LDS Church), an administrative area of The Church of Jesus Christ of Latter-day Saints
The Christian Mission, the former name of the Salvation Army

Government and military
Bolivarian missions, a series of social programs created during Hugo Chávez's rule of Venezuela
Diplomatic mission, a diplomatic outpost in a foreign territory
Military operation
Mission statement, a formal, short, written articulation of an organization's purpose
Sortie or combat mission, a deployment or dispatch of a military unit
Space mission, a journey of craft into outer space

Geography

Australia 
 Mission River, Queensland, a locality in the Shire of Cook and the Aboriginal Shire of Napranum
Mission River (Queensland), a river in Australia

Canada 
Mission, British Columbia, a district municipality
Mission, Calgary, Alberta, a neighbourhood
Okanagan Mission, a neighbourhood in Kelowna, British Columbia, commonly called "the Mission"
Mission River, a short river located at the delta of the Kaministiquia River of northern Ontario, Canada

United States 
Mission, Delaware
Mission, Kansas
Mission, Minnesota
Mission, Oregon
Mission, South Dakota
Mission, Texas
Mission District, San Francisco, a neighborhood in San Francisco, California, commonly called "the Mission"
South Pasadena station, formerly called Mission station
Mission Viejo, California
Mission River, a river in Texas, U.S.

Entertainment

Film and TV
The Mission (1986 film), a drama film set in colonial South America
Missions (TV series), a 2017 French science-fiction TV drama series

Music
Mission (album), 2016 album by Japanese singer/songwriter Mari Hamada
"Mission" (song), a song from the album Hold Your Fire by Rush
 "Mission", a song from the EP Van She by the Australian band Van She
"The Mission", a song from the album Revenge by Janis Ian
"Mission", a song by American rapper Jaden from his 2019 album ERYS

Other uses
Mission, a British hi-fi manufacturer owned by International Audio Group
Mission Foods, an American maker of tortillas and salsa, owned by Gruma
Mission Hockey, hockey equipment manufacturer
Mission (grape), a variety of grape
Mission olive, a cultivar of olive developed in California

See also
Mission Hills (disambiguation)
Mission Style (disambiguation)
La Mission (disambiguation)
Old mission (disambiguation)
The Mission (disambiguation)
List of Spanish missions
Spanish missions in California
Timeline of Christian missions
Missionary (disambiguation)